Sammy Alex Mutahi (born 1 June 1989) is a Kenyan long-distance runner who specializes in the 5000 metres.

He finished third at the 2009 World Athletics Final.

His personal best times are 7:31.41 minutes in the 3000 metres, achieved in September 2009 in Rieti; 13:00.12 minutes in the 5000 metres, achieved in May 2010 in Rome; and 27:12.42 minutes in the 10,000 metres, achieved in September 2009 in Tokamachi.  He has an indoor 3000 metres personal best of 7:32.02, achieved in Stockholm on February 10, 2010, which ranks Mutahi as #8 all-time.

References

1989 births
Living people
Kenyan male long-distance runners